Pierre Nicolas Brunet (1733, in Paris – 4 November 1771) was an 18th-century French writer and playwright.

Works 
1756: Minorque conquise, poème héroïque en 4 chants
1758: Les Noms changés, ou l'Indifférent corrigé, comedy in five acts and in verse, played seven times in a row at Théâtre-Français
1739: Les Faux Devins, in five acts and in verse, with Antoine Jean Sticotti
1758: Les Festes d'Euterpe
1760: La rentrée des théâtres, ou L'invention, in one act and in verse.
1762: La Fausse Turqile, in collaboration at Théâtre de la foire. 
1769: Hippomène et Atalante, ballet héroïque in one act. 
1769: Thèagène et Charidée

Sources

External links 
 Pierre-Nicolas Brunet on Data.bnf.fr

18th-century French dramatists and playwrights
French opera librettists
Writers from Paris
1733 births
1771 deaths